Faedo Valtellino is a comune (municipality) in the Province of Sondrio in the Italian region Lombardy, located about  northeast of Milan and about  southeast of Sondrio.

Faedo Valtellino borders the municipalities of Albosaggia, Montagna in Valtellina, Piateda, and Sondrio.

References

External links
 Official website

Cities and towns in Lombardy